Exit Strategy of the Soul is the title of the eleventh studio album by Canadian singer-songwriter Ron Sexsmith.

Track listing
All songs by Ronald Eldon Sexsmith except when specified.
"Spiritude" (instrumental) – 1:32
"This Is How I Know" – 3:52
"One Last Round" – 3:13
"Ghost of a Chance" – 3:40
"Thoughts and Prayers" – 2:55
"Brandy Alexander" (Ronald Eldon Sexsmith and Feist) – 3:29
"Traveling Alone" – 3:47
"Poor Helpless Dreams" – 3:53
"Hard Time" – 3:13
"The Impossible World" – 2:52
"Chased by Love" – 3:40
"Brighter Still" – 3:01
"Music to My Ears" – 3:43
"Dawn Anna" (instrumental) – 2:15
"Here Comes My Baby" (Japanese Bonus Track) 
"Rain On The Roof" (Japanese Bonus Track) 
"Too Good To Be True" (Japanese Bonus Track) 
"Comrades Fill No Glass For Me" (Japanese Bonus Track) 
"Seems To Me (iTunes & Japanese Bonus Track)

 Recorded by Dyre Gormsen
 Mixed by George Tandero, Martin Terefe and Thomas Juth

Personnel
 Ron Sexsmith – vocals, guitar, piano
 Neil Primrose – drums
 Sven Lindvall – bass (except tracks 1,2,12 and 14)
 Martin Terefe – electric guitar, bass (tracks 1 and 2), piano (track 12)
 Claes Björklund – keyboards, omnichord, piano (tracks 6 and 9)
 Emilio Del Monte Sr. – timbales and other percussion
 Emilio Del Monte Jr. – congas and other percussion
 Joaquin Betancourt – horns arrangement
 Alexander Abreu – trumpet
 Amaury Perez – trombone
 Jose Luis "Chewy" Hernandez – saxophone
 David Davidson – strings arrangement on "Dawn Anna', violin
 David Angell – violin
 Kris Wilkinson – viola
 John Catchings – cello
 Alexis Puentes – upright bass (track 12), nylon string guitar (track 11)
 Jamie Scott – cuatro (tracks 6,8 and 11), additional electric guitar (tracks 9 and 10)
 Kevin Hearn – piano (track 10), wurlitzer (track 2)
 A Girl Called Eddy – backing vocals (track 6)
 Colleen Hixenbaugh – backing vocals (track 7)

References

External links
Discography at Ron Sexsmith Official Homepage

2008 albums
Ron Sexsmith albums